Kharua Rajapur High School is a high secondary school of Kharua Rajapur in Bongaon, North 24 Parganas, West Bengal. Number of students in the school is 400+ . There are 17 teachers and 3 other staff members in the school Currently (2017), there are arrangements for teaching in the arts department and science department in the school.

History 
The school was established in 1962 with the introduction of Kharua Rajapur village peoples. The school is the first arrangement for reading class 8. In 2001, the school started teaching up to class 10.  After that, the school became a higher secondary school in 2010 and is giving teaching up to class 12 class.

Department

Art
 Bengali
 English 
 History 
 Geography 
 Sanskrit
 Education

Science Categories 
 Mathematical 
 Physics
 Chemistry 
 Biology 
 Environmentalism

Library 
There is a library in the school. There are more than 500 books. This library The students are constantly inclined to increase their knowledge.

School infrastructure

The school has 29 classrooms. In the school of 3 supervisors and a flourishing playground. The school's entrance is on the south side of the school. Wall has been built on the south side of the school And the remaining three were surrounded by wire. The school has a total of 4.6 bigha or 1.5 acres of land. The school has clean drinking water facilities.

See also
Education in India
List of schools in India
Education in West Bengal

References

External links
 WBCHSE. Institutions of 24 Pgs. (N). WBCHSE website. Retrieved 27 July 2012 
 WBCHSE. Boys' institutions in 24 Pgs. (N) West Bengal Council of Higher Secondary Education official website. Retrieved 27 July 2012
 Kharua-Rajapur-high-school in Facebook

High schools and secondary schools in West Bengal
Schools in North 24 Parganas district
Educational institutions established in 1864
1864 establishments in India
Educational institutions established in 1962
1962 establishments in West Bengal